Vladislav Herić (Serbian Cyrillic: Владислав Херић born 29 August 1966) is a Serbian professional football manager.

Career

Bay United F.C.
Parted ways with Bay United F.C. after 6 losses, 2 wins, and one tie.

Chippa United
He first came to prominence as a manager in the 2013-14 National First Division, winning it with four games to spare.

Ajax Cape Town Youth
Not long before December 2015, multiple sources disseminated information about his possible move to Ajax Cape Town F.C.
which he did move to in December as team overseer. The coach almost went back to Polokwane City F.C. but Polokwane City F.C. and Royal Eagles F.C. failed to agree terms on compensation.
Influenced by Roger De Sa to coach the team he claimed that was why he took up the Ajax Cape Town Youth job as well as his family already residing in Cape Town.

Took pride in the national recognition of four players from the Ajax Cape Town Youth who made the latest South Africa U-20.
Got called up as assistant coach in an encounter between Ajax and Maritzburg United F.C. in November 2016 since regular assistant Mich d'Avray was unavailable.

References

External links
 
 

Serbian football managers
Expatriate soccer managers in South Africa
Ajax Cape Town F.C. managers
Club Africain football managers
Black Leopards F.C. managers
Polokwane City F.C. managers
Maritzburg United F.C. managers
Chippa United F.C. managers
Free State Stars F.C. managers
Living people
1950 births